Balenkine-Sud is a settlement in the Bignona Department of the Ziguinchor Region in Senegal. In 2015 its population was estimated at 315.

References

External links
PEPAM

Populated places in the Bignona Department
Arrondissement of Tenghory